Olivier Mbaissidara Mbaizo (born 15 August 1997) is a Cameroonian professional footballer who plays as a defender for the Philadelphia Union of Major League Soccer and the Cameroon national team.

Club career

Union Douala
Mbaizo began his professional career at Union Douala of MTN Elite One league in 2016. He helped Douala to 4th in the league table and made an appearance in the CAF Champions League against Zamalek SC.

Rainbow FC
In 2017, Mbaizo played for Rainbow FC making 10 appearances during the season.

Bethlehem Steel FC
In January 2018, Mbaizo signed for Bethlehem Steel FC, the USL affiliate of the Philadelphia Union. The organization reunites him with fellow Cameroonian youth national, Eric Ayuk.

Philadelphia Union
By April 2018, Mbaizo was signed to Bethlehem Steel's MLS affiliate Philadelphia Union after impressing with the first team during preseason training. While signed with the Union, Mbaizo would mostly be loaned back to Bethlehem for the 2018 season. He made his first team debut for the Union in September, starting in a 2–0 win over Sporting Kansas City.

International career
Mbaizo has worked his way up the Cameroonian national team ladder starting with the U17s in 2014 and most recently earning a call-up for training with the senior team. In 2017, he appeared with Cameroon's U-20's for the 2017 Africa U-20 Cup of Nations. He started all three matches and played every minute of the team's Group Stage. Mbaizo scored a goal in their second match of the tournament, a 4–1 victory over Sudan on 2 March 2017.

Mbaizo earned his first senior call-up in November 2020 for the 2021 Africa Cup of Nations qualifying matches. He debuted for Cameroon on 12 November, starting in a 4–1 victory over Mozambique.

Career statistics

Club

International

Honours
Philadelphia Union
Supporters' Shield: 2020

Cameroon
Africa Cup of Nations bronze: 2021

References

External links

Profile at the Bethlehem Steel FC official website

1997 births
Living people
Cameroonian footballers
Cameroonian expatriate sportspeople in the United States
Cameroon international footballers
Cameroon under-20 international footballers
Cameroon youth international footballers
2021 Africa Cup of Nations players
2022 FIFA World Cup players
Association football defenders
Major League Soccer players
Philadelphia Union players
Philadelphia Union II players
Footballers from Douala
Union Douala players
USL Championship players